William H. Borthwick (February 13, 1848 – October 17, 1928) was mayor of Ottawa from 1895 to 1896.

He was born near Mer Bleue in Gloucester Township in 1848. He went to California in 1868 and worked in 
the timber trade there. He returned to Ottawa in 1872 and opened a grocery store. He was first elected as an alderman in 1887.

He was also a Freemason and member of Prince of Wales Lodge #371 in Ottawa, serving as its first Director of Ceremonies in 1879 and then Master of the Lodge in 1895 and 1896. 

He died in 1928 of pneumonia and was buried in Beechwood Cemetery.

References 

Chain of Office: Biographical Sketches of the Early Mayors of Ottawa (1847-1948), Dave Mullington

1848 births
1928 deaths
Mayors of Ottawa